Sir John Lymbrick Esmonde, 14th Baronet (15 December 1893 – 6 July 1958) was an Irish nationalist politician who served as Member of Parliament (MP) in the Parliament of the United Kingdom from 1915 to 1918 and later as a Teachta Dála (TD) in Dáil Éireann from 1937 to 1944, and again from 1948 to 1951.

Early life
Esmonde was born 15 December 1893 at Pontesbury, Shropshire, England, eldest among three sons and three daughters of John Joseph Esmonde MP, a medical doctor who practised for twenty-four years in England before returning to family lands at Drominagh, Borrisokane, County Tipperary. He was educated at schools in Germany and Belgium, and at Clongowes Wood College, County Kildare. He apprenticed as a marine engineer at Harland and Wolff, Belfast from 1911 to 1914.

World War I
On the death of his father in 1915 during service with the Royal Army Medical Corps in World War I, he was elected in the by-election in his place (opposed by two nationalist contenders) as Irish Parliamentary Party MP for North Tipperary while also serving in the war with the Leinster Regiment, then as Captain with the Royal Dublin Fusiliers with the Intelligence Corps. He was the Baby of the House when elected.

He was one of five Irish MPs who served with Irish regiments in World War I, the others Stephen Gwynn, Willie Redmond, William Redmond and D. D. Sheehan as well as former MP Tom Kettle. Esmonde served with the forces that put down the 1916 Easter Rising.

Legal career
He studied at the King's Inns, qualifying as a barrister, and was called to the Bar of Ireland. He was called to the inner bar as Senior Counsel in 1942, and was elected as a Bencher of the King's Inns in 1948.

Political career
He did not defend his seat at the 1918 general election. He inherited the Esmonde Baronetcy when the senior male line died out in 1943. He was defeated in the 1936 Wexford by-election to fill the vacancy created by the death of the sitting TD, his second cousin Sir Osmond Esmonde. He subsequently served as a Fine Gael Teachta Dála (TD) for the Wexford constituency, where he won a seat at the 1937 general election. He was re-elected at the 1938 and 1943 elections, but lost his Dáil seat at the 1944 general election. He was re-elected as a TD for Wexford at the 1948 general election. 

In 1948, before the formation of the First Inter-Party Government, he was suggested as possible Taoiseach by Seán MacBride, on the grounds that he had no link to either side in the Civil War, a position that went to John A. Costello.

In July 1950, he resigned from Fine Gael, although he kept his resignation private until September, after the 1950 local elections. He gave as his reason the predominance in the party of Cumann na nGaedheal over the old National Centre Party (to which he belonged originally), the lack of consultation with backbenchers and concessions made to the Labour Party. It seems likely that he was aggrieved that he was not appointed to succeed Cecil Lavery as Attorney General in April 1950. He continued to support the government as an independent. On 1 May 1951, he resigned from the Dáil, shortly before the 1951 general election.

He was one of the few people who served as a Members of Parliament in the House of Commons as well as a Teachta Dála of Dáil Éireann, the lower House of the Irish parliament.

Notable family
His younger brother Lt. Geoffrey Esmonde (1897–1916) aged 19 was killed in action in World War I serving with the 4th Tyneside Irish Battalion of the Northumberland Fusiliers. His second younger brother was Sir Anthony Esmonde, 15th Baronet. His half-brother Eugene Esmonde was awarded a Victoria Cross posthumously in 1942 during World War II.

Later life and death
He married Eleanor Fitzharris in 1922; they had no children. He died on 6 July 1958 in a Dublin nursing home.

See also
Families in the Oireachtas

References

External links

1893 births
1958 deaths
People of the Easter Rising
Irish barristers
Irish farmers
Irish Parliamentary Party MPs
Irish Senior Counsel
UK MPs 1910–1918
Members of the Parliament of the United Kingdom for County Tipperary constituencies (1801–1922)
Fine Gael TDs
Independent TDs
Members of the 9th Dáil
Members of the 10th Dáil
Members of the 11th Dáil
Members of the 13th Dáil
Prince of Wales's Leinster Regiment officers
Royal Dublin Fusiliers officers
Irish people of World War I
British Army personnel of World War I
Baronets in the Baronetage of Ireland
Politicians from County Wexford
John
Alumni of King's Inns